Yosvanys Peña Flores (born 24 December 1993) is a Cuban Greco-Roman wrestler. At the Pan American Wrestling Championships he won the gold medal in the 77 kg event both in 2019 and in 2020. He also represented Cuba at the 2020 Summer Olympics held in Tokyo, Japan.

Career 

In 2010, he won the silver medal in the boys' Greco-Roman 42 kg event at the Summer Youth Olympics held in Singapore. In the final he lost against Murad Bazarov of Azerbaijan.

In March 2020, he qualified at the Pan American Olympic Qualification Tournament held in Ottawa, Canada to represent Cuba at the 2020 Summer Olympics. He competed in the 77 kg event at the 2020 Summer Olympics held in Tokyo, Japan.

He competed in the 77kg event at the 2022 World Wrestling Championships held in Belgrade, Serbia.

Achievements

References

External links 
 

Living people
1993 births
Place of birth missing (living people)
Cuban male sport wrestlers
Wrestlers at the 2010 Summer Youth Olympics
Wrestlers at the 2019 Pan American Games
Medalists at the 2019 Pan American Games
Pan American Games medalists in wrestling
Pan American Games bronze medalists for Cuba
Pan American Wrestling Championships medalists
Wrestlers at the 2020 Summer Olympics
Olympic wrestlers of Cuba
21st-century Cuban people